State Route 371 (SR 371) is very short north–south state highway in the south central portion of Ohio.

Created in the mid-1930s, this two-lane spur highway, whose entire length is just , provides access to Shawnee State Park from SR 73.

Route description

All of SR 371 is situated within Scioto County's Union Township. It is not included as a part of the National Highway System.

Starting from a ranger station at the entrance to Shawnee State Park, SR 371 starts out heading northerly, then bending to the northeast, bounded by woods on the west side and fields on the east side, with a couple of residences and one church lining the route. After just , SR 371 comes to an end as it meets SR 73.

History
This short spur route was first designated in 1934 along its current path, and has not undergone any major changes since its inception.

Major intersections

References

371
Transportation in Scioto County, Ohio
State highways in the United States shorter than one mile